Twisted Typhoon is an inverted roller coaster currently operating at Wild Adventures in Valdosta, Georgia. Manufactured by Vekoma, the ride opened at the park in 1999 under the name Hangman, becoming Twisted Typhoon after 2011.

References

External links 

 Official page
 Page on the Roller Coaster Database
 Entry on CoasterBuzz

Roller coasters in Georgia (U.S. state)
Wild Adventures
Roller coasters operated by Herschend Family Entertainment